World Builder's Guidebook is an accessory for the 2nd edition of the Advanced Dungeons & Dragons fantasy role-playing game, published in 1996.

Contents
The volume begins by highlighting various approaches to world creation, explaining the merits of each and detailing how the Dungeon Master can use the book to create a unique fictional universe (aka a fantasy setting) from scratch. A selection of blank maps is included at the end of the book, ranging from grids to draw a whole planet overview to smaller separate regions and individual kingdoms.

Reception
David Comford reviewed World Builder's Guidebook for Arcane magazine, rating it a 9 out of 10 overall. He commented that "At one time or another I would wager everyone reading arcane has thought wistfully of designing their own roleplaying game. For most of us that is as far as it ever gets - but if you've actually sat down to map out your lands it can suddenly all seem rather daunting. But fear not, The World Builder's Guidebook is a methodical step-by-step guide to creating your own fantasy setting to use in an AD&D universe." Comford adds: "And, what's more, it's good. Better than that, it's excellent, from the shape and size of your world to the climate and racial cultures present, and even further to the ecology and mythology of your land. All can be found here presented in a format that's easy to read and with countless random roll tables." He continues: "Some might think that world creation is a personal thing, and that a book like this takes an element of fun out of its creation. Not so. Yes there are countless pointers and pushes in the right direction, but the option to disregard any and all information that doesn't fit in with your theme is repeated throughout." Comford concludes the review by saying, "The World Builder's Guidebook is either a good reference tool for reminding you of the bits that you've left out, or a comprehensive world creating machine that is easily followed."

References

Dungeons & Dragons sourcebooks
Role-playing game supplements introduced in 1996